"Anthem" is a song by Australian rock band the Clouds, released in February 1992 as the second and final single from the band's debut studio album, Penny Century (1991). A limited edition came with a bonus VHS featuring 4 video clips. The single peaked at number 47 on the ARIA charts.

Track listing
CD, 7-inch single, and cassette single (865 487-2; 865 486-7; 865 487-4)
 "Anthem"	
 "For a Few Bucks More"	
 "Tear Me Apart"	
 "Swim"
 "Eemush" 

VHS single (511 398V)
 "Anthem" – 2:10
 "Soul Eater" – 2:38
 "Hieronymous" – 3:47
 "Cloud Factory" – 3:48

Charts

References

1991 songs
1992 singles
Polydor Records singles